Bob Dylan at Budokan is a live album by American singer-songwriter Bob Dylan, released August 1978 on Columbia Records in Japan only, followed by a worldwide release in April 1979. It was recorded during his 1978 world tour and is composed mostly of the artist's "greatest hits". The performances in the album are radically altered from the originals, using the same musicians that backed Street-Legal, but relying on a much larger band and stronger use of brass and backing singers. In some respects the arrangements are more conventional than the original arrangements, for which the album was criticized. For a few critics, such as Janet Maslin of Rolling Stone, the differences between the older and newer arrangements had become less important.

Recording and releases
The audio recording is from shows on February 28 and March 1, 1978. Columbia Records released this double LP in Japan on August 21, 1978. Later that year, it was released in Australia and New Zealand. On April 23, 1979, spurred by extensive importing and at least one counterfeit European edition, Columbia released the album to worldwide markets. The shows were the fourth and fifth in an eight-show appearance at Nippon Budokan Hall in Tokyo, Japan.

Reception and legacy

In a sarcastic review published in his "Consumer Guide" column, Robert Christgau gave the album a C+ rating, writing "I believe this double LP was made available so our hero could boast of being outclassed by Cheap Trick, who had the self-control to release but a single disc from this location". Critic Jimmy Guterman named it one of the worst albums ever released in the history of rock.

However, the album received stronger reviews in Europe, and critic Janet Maslin (then a music critic for Rolling Stone magazine) defended the album in her review. "The method here is hit-or-miss, and the results are correspondingly spotty", Maslin wrote. "The fire and brimstone are behind Dylan, [but] this hardly means the fight has gone out of him: Bob Dylan at Budokan is a very contentious effort—and, for the most part, a victorious one".

NJArts' Jay Lustig called it the "least essential" of Dylan's three live albums of the 1970s but also noted that it allowed him to bring "some new nuances to his material" and cited "the slow, aching 'I Want You" as the standout track.

Stereogum ran an article to coincide with Dylan's 80th birthday on May 24, 2021 in which 80 musicians were asked to name their favorite Dylan songs. Steve Gunn selected the Budokan version of "Shelter from the Storm", noting that "the delivery is declarative and minimal, holding a steady line and giving the song a different life than the original. There’s a new confidence, which gives one of my all-time favorite Dylan lines new resonance: 'I came in from the wilderness, a creature void of form'. Dylan’s life is full of comeback waves, and the energy propulsing through this song is testament to his genius for looking deeper into his art".

Track listing

Personnel
 Bob Dylan — vocals, guitar, harmonica
 Steve Douglas — saxophone, flute, recorder
 Steven Soles — acoustic guitar, backing vocals
 David Mansfield — pedal steel guitar, violin, mandolin, dobro, guitar
 Billy Cross — lead guitar
 Alan Pasqua — keyboards
 Rob Stoner — bass, backing vocals
 Ian Wallace — drums
 Bobbye Hall — percussion
 Ed Rash — tambourine
 Debi Dye, Jo Ann Harris, Helena Springs —backing vocals

Production
 Don DeVito — production
 Tim Charles — monitor mixer
 Val Lane — sound technician

Charts

Weekly charts

Year-end charts

Certifications

References

1979 live albums
Albums produced by Don DeVito
Bob Dylan live albums
Columbia Records live albums
Albums recorded at the Nippon Budokan